Caloptilia bistrigella is a moth of the family Gracillariidae. It is known from Flores in the Azores.

The larvae feed on Myrica faya.

References

bistrigella
Moths of Europe
Moths described in 1940